Pink Pearl may refer to:

a pink-colored pearl, which is produced naturally by some mollusks, especially the queen conch
Pink Pearl, an album by American singer/songwriter Jill Sobule
Pink Pearl (apple), an apple cultivar developed in 1944 by northern California breeder Albert Etter
Pink Pearl (comics), a fictional terrorist in comics published by Marvel Comics
Pink Pearl (eraser), a writing product registered to the Newell Rubbermaid company
"Pink Pearl of Persia", an episode of the 1966 animated television series Batfink